GEM is the third album from Beni Arashiro on the Avex Trax label. This album has two versions: a CD-only version and a CD+DVD version. The DVD contains all of the promoting videos and a CECIL McBEE trailer. This was the last studio album Beni Arashiro released before she switched to label Universal Music Japan and her stage name to BENI.

The album charted on the #114 on the Oricon charts.

Track listing

Charts

Singles

References

2007 albums
Beni (singer) albums

es:GEM